Pulse Niagara was an alternative weekly newspaper serving the Niagara Region in Ontario, Canada. Its offices were located in downtown St. Catharines, Ontario.

Pulse Niagara was a weekly publication which served the Niagara region of Ontario. In 2010 it merged with Hamilton's View Magazine to serve both markets which are right beside each other.

Masthead 

Publisher: Ron Kilpatrick
Editor in Chief: Jordy Yack
Editorial Assistant: Alexandra Bates
Advertising Sales Manager: Dayna Dubecki
Gaming Section: Christina Winterburn

Founded by Jenifer Cass in December 1986, PULSE NIAGARA emerged as the Niagara Region's premier voice of independent music. Editor David DeRocco penned the magazine's first feature, a 1986 article on homegrown band Honeymoon Suite. The magazine was sold to Dynasty in 1996.

See also
List of newspapers in Canada

External links 

Pulse Niagara

Alternative weekly newspapers published in Canada
Mass media in St. Catharines
Weekly newspapers published in Ontario
Publications established in 1985
1985 establishments in Ontario